Xanbulan is a village and municipality in the Lankaran Rayon of Azerbaijan. It has a population of 1,303.  The municipality consists of the villages of Xanbulan and Sərinbulaq.

References

Populated places in Lankaran District